Shisir Khanal is a Nepali politician and member of Rastriya Swatantra Party. He is a former Minister of  Education, Science and Technology. He was elected in 2022 from Kathmandu 6 to the House of Representatives.

Shisir received his Master of International Public Affairs (MIPA) from UW–Madison's Robert M. La Follette School of Public Affairs in 2005.

References 

Rastriya Swatantra Party politicians
Nepal MPs 2022–present
1978 births
Living people